Michel Sapin (born 9 April 1952 is a French politician who served as Minister of Finance from 1992 to 1993 and again from 2014 to 2017. He is a member of the Socialist Party.

He was Minister of the Civil Service from 2000 to 2002 and Minister of Labour, Employment and Social Affairs from 2012 to 2014. Sapin has also served as a member of the National Assembly of France.

After President François Hollande took office, Sapin became the Minister of Labour, Employment and Social Affairs in the government headed by Prime Minister Jean-Marc Ayrault on 16 May 2012. Two years later, he was moved to the post of Minister of Finance under Ayrault's successor, Manuel Valls.

Early life and education
Sapin was born on 9 April 1952 in Boulogne-Billancourt, Hauts-de-Seine, France. He attended the Lycée Henri IV, followed by Paris-Sorbonne University, where he received a B.A. in History and an MPhil in Geography. He then attended the École Normale Supérieure, the Institut d'études politiques de Paris, and the École nationale d'administration. He graduated from the ENA as part of the Promotion Voltaire, which also included François Hollande, Dominique de Villepin, Ségolène Royal and Renaud Donnedieu de Vabres. He became an administrative law judge.

Political career
From 1989 to 1994, Sapin served as councillor for Nanterre. From 1995 to 2001, he was the Mayor of Argenton-sur-Creuse. He has served again as such since 2002. He served as Deputy Minister of Justice from May 1991 to April 1992, Finance Minister from April 1992 to March 1993, and Minister of Civil Servants and State Reforms from March 2000 to May 2002.

In 2012 Sapin was appointed Minister of Social Affairs by President Francois Hollande. From April 2014, he then served as head of a newly created ministry dealing with public finances under Prime Minister Manuel Valls.

On 30 August 2016, following the resignation of Emmanuel Macron as Minister of the Economy in preparation for Macron to be sworn-in as President, the duties of the office were added to Sapin’s remit. He thus became the Minister for the Economy and Finance.

Sapin supported Manuel Valls in the Socialist Party primary of 2017. Following Valls’ defeat to Benoît Hamon, he supported Hamon in the presidential election while also defending Francois Hollande’s record as president.

Political positions
In March 2016, Sapin stated his opposition to universal basic income in an interview with France Info.

Personal life
When President Hollande published a list of bank deposits and property held by all 38 ministers for first time 2012, Sapin declared personal assets worth 2 million euros.

In the remainder of the case concerning the indemnities wrongly paid to Sapin while he was mayor of Argenton-sur-Creuse, the administrative court of Limoges by order of 30 March 2017 has just rejected the personal request of Sapin and Of the other elected representatives of Argenton who had formed a third party against the judgment of 29 September 2016.

Bibliography 
L'État en mouvement (2002), Bruno Leprince
 Jamais sans l'Europe ! Entretiens croisés de deux Européens convaincus with Wolfgang Schäuble (2016), Débats Publics. 
 L’Écume et l'Océan, Chronique d'un ministre du travail par gros temps (2014), Flammarion

References

|-

|-

|-

|-

1952 births
Living people
People from Boulogne-Billancourt
Politicians from Île-de-France
Socialist Party (France) politicians
French Ministers of Finance
Deputies of the 7th National Assembly of the French Fifth Republic
Deputies of the 8th National Assembly of the French Fifth Republic
Deputies of the 9th National Assembly of the French Fifth Republic
Deputies of the 13th National Assembly of the French Fifth Republic
Presidents of the Regional Council of Centre-Val de Loire
Members of the Regional Council of Centre-Val de Loire
École nationale d'administration alumni
Lycée Henri-IV alumni
École Normale Supérieure alumni
Sciences Po alumni
Paris-Sorbonne University alumni